The seventh season of 7th Heaven—an American family-drama television series, created and produced by Brenda Hampton—premiered on September 16, 2002, on The WB, and concluded on May 19, 2003 (22 episodes).

Cast and characters

Main 
Stephen Collins as Eric Camden
Catherine Hicks as Annie Camden
David Gallagher as Simon Camden
Beverley Mitchell as Lucy Camden-Kinkirk
Mackenzie Rosman as Ruthie Camden
Nikolas and Lorenzo Brino as Sam and David Camden
George Stults as Kevin Kinkirk
Ashlee Simpson as Cecilia Smith
Rachel Blanchard as Roxanne Richardson
Jeremy London as Chandler Hampton (episodes 7-9, 11–22)
Happy as Happy the Dog

Recurring
Jessica Biel as Mary Camden (5 episodes)
Barry Watson as Matt Camden (3 episodes)
Adam LaVorgna as Robbie Palmer (8 episodes)
Scotty Leavenworth as Peter Petrowski (10 episodes)
Geoff Stults as Ben Kinkirk (12 episodes)

Episodes

References

2002 American television seasons
2003 American television seasons